The McConnell Range is a small subrange of the Swannell Ranges of the Omineca Mountains, located east of Moose Valley and west of McConnell Creek in northern British Columbia, Canada.

References

McConnell Range in the Canadian Mountain Encyclopedia

Swannell Ranges